{{Infobox video game
| title = Dead or Alive Xtreme 3
| image = DeadOrAliveXtreme3.jpg
| caption = Cover art for Dead or Alive Xtreme 3: Fortune featuring the series' characters, Marie Rose (left) and Honoka (right)
| alt = 
| developer = Team Ninja
| publisher = Koei TecmoDigital Touch (South Korea)
| series = Dead or Alive
| engine = 
| platforms = PlayStation 4, PlayStation Vita, Nintendo Switch, Microsoft Windows, MacOS
| released = Original (PlayStation 4 and Vita)Venus Vacation (DMM GAMES) (Steam) (Steam)Scarlet  (PlayStation 4 and Nintendo Switch)| genre = Sports
| modes = Single-player
| director = Yohei Shimbori
| producer = Yosuke Hayashi
| designer = Takayuki SagaTsuyoshi Iuchi
| artist = Kazuhiro Nishimura
}}Dead or Alive Xtreme 3 is a sports video game in the Dead or Alive series developed by Team Ninja and published by Koei Tecmo as the second sequel to the beach volleyball spin-off title Dead or Alive Xtreme Beach Volleyball. It was originally released in 2016, under two titles for the two different platforms, as Dead or Alive Xtreme 3: Fortune for PlayStation 4 and as Dead or Alive Xtreme 3: Venus for PlayStation Vita. The game was distributed in Asian territories, where it does contain an English language option, along with Simplified Chinese, Traditional Chinese and Korean language options. A PC downloadable version called Dead or Alive Xtreme Venus Vacation was released in 2017. An update for PlayStation 4 and Nintendo Switch ports, entitled Dead or Alive Xtreme 3: Scarlet was released in 2019, followed by a Steam port of Venus Vacation for specific Asia regions six days later, with support for English, Simplified Chinese, Traditional Chinese and Korean languages. Following the emergence of the COVID-19 pandemic, a Japanese version of Venus Vacation Steam port was released on August 19, 2020, which immediately continues DMM version's recent events.

Gameplay 
Dead or Alive Xtreme 3 is a sports game played from a third-person perspective and retains the camera mode from the earlier installments in the Dead or Alive Xtreme series. It features multiple gameplay modes, which includes mini-games such as beach volleyball and "butt battle". Game modes include beach flag, in which characters will compete in a race to retrieve a flag, and rock climbing. The feature which displays tan lines and swimsuit malfunctions is only available in PlayStation 4 version. In addition, there is a new suntanning system. As the player unlocks new costumes for one character, the items will also be available for use to all characters. There are also new modes like Girl Mode, where the player can take direct control of the girl they have selected, and Owner Mode, where the player becomes an owner of another island. The player is also able to initiate various activities with the girls, such as dating.

A new variation known as Photo Paradise was released in September 2016, allowing owners to take gravure pictures of the heroines in a variety of poses and swimsuits. The PlayStation Vita version uses the console's touch panel and gyro sensor features. The PS4 later added a virtual reality functionality.

Development
The development of Dead or Alive Xtreme 3 was first disclosed by Team Ninja head Yosuke Hayashi during Dead or Alive Festival on August 1, 2015. It was officially unveiled one week later in Famitsu, and the first screenshots were published on August 21. The PlayStation 4 version of game features an improved breast physics engine from Dead or Alive 5 Last Round, called Soft Engine 2.0, with the PlayStation Vita version using Soft Engine Lite. The Soft Engine 2.0 also allows the developers to implement greater realism towards object interactions, such as clothing wetness and deformation. The PlayStation 4 version is compatible with the PlayStation VR headset system. The release date was originally scheduled for February 25, 2016, however it was later pushed back to March.

A free-to-play version of the game was released on May 16, 2016. The version contains all gameplay features and activities to try out, but the player can only play as Kasumi; all other characters need to be purchased additionally. Originally, the PlayStation VR support patch was meant to be included for October 13, 2016, but was recently delayed for unknown reasons. Support was made available on January 24, 2017.

During Tokyo Game Show 2016, a PC downloadable version called Dead or Alive Xtreme Venus Vacation was announced to be released in 2017. During the 2018 Dead or Alive festival held in Japan in November, Koei Tecmo announced a new edition of the game, Dead or Alive Xtreme 3: Scarlet, will launch for the PlayStation 4 and the Nintendo Switch on March 20, 2019, in Japan and Asia at least, with pre-orders for the game opening on November 19, 2018.

Release
Dead or Alive Xtreme 3 was released to Asian markets for PlayStation versions only, but following protests from fans, Hayashi said a version of the game "adjusted for North America" might come to the West if the demand is high enough. However, on November 24, 2015, Team Ninja posted on the franchise's Facebook page stating that they will not release the game in Western territories. The Asian version will include an English language option and is region-free on both systems.

Following the announcement not to release the PlayStation version of the game outside Asia, a public debate arose whether this was due to avoid criticism of the sexualized portrayal of women in the games, or the comparatively low North American and European sales of the previous game in the Dead or Alive Xtreme series. Shuhei Yoshida, president of SIE Worldwide Studios, said in a statement; "It's due to cultural differences. The West has its own thinking about how to depict women in games media which is different from Japan." In response to the decision not to distribute, the developer behind the adult puzzle game and dating sim HuniePop offered Koei Tecmo a million dollars for distribution rights in North America.

Characters

The original game's nine playable female characters were selected from the 15 candidates of the roster of Dead or Alive 5 Last Round as the ones whose paid character themes have been downloaded most by fans on the PlayStation Store, but only the downloads from Japan count. The top two characters will also be featured in the first-print run bonuses. The results were announced during Tokyo Game Show 2015. Originally, no additional characters are planned to be added through DLC until they were added in the updated versions prior to corresponding later titles.

Marie Rose (17.6%)
Honoka (14.9%)
Kasumi (12.0%)
Ayane (8.2%)
Kokoro (8.0%)
Nyotengu (7.6%)
Hitomi (5.9%)
Momiji (5.1%)
Helena Douglas (4.9%)

Dead or Alive Xtreme: Venus Vacation exclusive characters. Currently, only Leifang and the new character Misaki were also added exclusively in Scarlet and as DLC for PlayStation 4 version of Xtreme 3. Players who started Venus Vacation for the first time must select two initial girls between one of the original Xtreme 3 roster, whereas Misaki can be chosen as the first optional secondary character to pick, while the others who were released in post-launch events of Venus Vacation can only be unlocked via gacha:
 Misaki
 Luna
 Tamaki
 Leifang
 Nagisa
 Fiona
 Kanna
 Monica
 Sayuri
 Patty
 Tsukushi
 Lobelia
 Nanami
 Elise
 Koharu
 Tina Armstrong
 Amy
 Shandy
 Yukino

Reception 

In the first week of its release, the Fortune version sold 44,723 copies while the Venus version sold 21,959 copies. In an April 2016 financial report, Koei Tecmo revealed that Dead or Alive Xtreme 3 collectively shipped 190,000 copies within a month. LewdGamer noted that the sales are higher than Koei Tecmo's Atelier Sophie: The Alchemist of the Mysterious Book (170K) and Romance of the Three Kingdoms 13 (180K), two titles in the same report which were out for months longer.

Play-Asia, an import game retailer, reported that they had their highest pre-order record yet with the release of Dead or Alive Xtreme 3. The prior record holder was the Japanese release of J-Stars Victory VS, a game which was initially considered unlikely to be localised due to rights limitations involving multiple anime licenses. Dead or Alive Xtreme 3 eventually broke Play-Asia sales records as well.

Famitsu reviewed both versions of the game 32/40 (8/8/8/8). Operation Rainfall gave Dead or Alive Xtreme 3 a score of 3 stars out of 5, and although they praised the graphics and visual engine, they found Dead or Alive Xtreme 3 to be more of a technical demo than a finished game. They also noted that the game has "lots of replay value."

Notes

References

External links
 
  (Scarlet)
  (Venus Vacation)
  (Venus Vacation)

2016 video games
Beach volleyball video games
Bishōjo games
Dead or Alive (franchise) spin-off games
Nintendo Switch games
Photography games
PlayStation 4 games
PlayStation Vita games
PlayStation VR games
Romance video games
Video games featuring female protagonists
Video game sequels
Video games developed in Japan
Windows games
Works about vacationing
MacOS games
Single-player video games